The Lectorium is a non-profit organization headquartered in Rostov-on-Don, Russia. It produce enlightenment and edutainment open events and projecting a worldwide on-line educational center.

Mission
Make all worldwide on-line educational products free and open for people.

History
The Lectorium enlightenment project was founded on September 26, 2009. Now (on May 11, 2011) it produced more than 80 events.

Activities
Every week project is producing edutainment and enlightenment events with participation of local celebrities and young sciences. The Lectorium produce different format open events: discussions, lectures, seminars, etc. Russian Wiki-conference 2010 in Rostov-on-Don was organized by cooperation of Wikimedia RU and Lectorium. Now Lectorium team works on worldwide open on-line educational center.

External links
 Lectorium's official page

References

Organizations established in 2009
Non-profit organizations based in Russia
Non-profit technology
Rostov-on-Don
Crowdsourcing